Sylvester is a community in the Canadian province of Nova Scotia in Pictou County.

References
Sylvester on Destination Nova Scotia

Communities in Pictou County
General Service Areas in Nova Scotia